Queer Pride Guwahati was organised for the first time by the members and supporters of the local LGBT community in Guwahati, Assam on 9 February 2014. The Queer Pride Guwahati was the first LGBT Pride in the entire North Eastern India. The Pride is expected to become an annual event.

History

After 11 December 2013 judgement by the Supreme Court of India which reinstated the colonial era Section 377, IPC thereby criminalising homosexual activities, protests were organised all over the world. On 15 December 2013 a Global Day of Rage was organized simultaneously in a number of cities around the world. A group of people from Guwahati also joined in with the rest of the world to observe the Global Day of Rage in the city, making it the first ever public protest for LGBT issues in Guwahati. Soon after the protests, a group of volunteers got together and decided to organize an LGBT Pride Parade in Guwahati.

2014
The Queer Pride Guwahati was held on 9 February. It started at 10 AM from Dighalipukhuri and went through RBI Point, Old S.P Office, Commissioners Point, Latasil, Lamb Road and ended at T.C Fountain Point. The Pride also passed in front of the Gauhati High Court where the pride walkers raised slogans against the recent Supreme Court judgement.
Approximately 150 people walked the Pride. It saw participants from various schools and colleges. People from other cities and states were also present in the Pride.

The costs of the Queer Pride Guwahati was supported through donations from local individuals and individuals at the Queer Azaadi Mumbai and the Delhi Queer Pride committee. A few NGOs based in Guwahati also supported the Pride.

The organizers of the pride also faced some backlash. The office of one of the supporting NGOs was vandalised by some right wing conservatives. Some of the participants received threat calls. On the day of the pride, a few members of Hindu Yuva Chatra Parishad, a right wing student party, tried to stop the pride but were arrested by the police.

Soon after the Pride, some of the organisers got together and created XUKIA, a queer collective to take further the LGBT activism in the region.

2015
After the Queer Pride Guwahati, 2014, Manipur also held a Pride Walk in Imphal. In 2015, individuals, groups and organisations from different parts of the North East decided to organise a collective pride and so the LGBT North East Pride Walk, 2015 was held on 15 February 2015 in Guwahati. The walk proceeded through the route from Dighalipukhuri-RBI Point- Food Villa Point- High Court- Latasil Point- Ambari- Guwahati Club Rotary.

2016 
The third Guwahati Walk took place on 7 February 2016 at Dighalipukhuri, Guwahati and was attended by around 200 people. As part of the celebrations a street fashion show was also held. It was organised by Xukia, a group which works for LGBTQ issues in North-East. The walk began from Dighalipukhri Park and covered areas in the city like Handique Girls College, Food Villa, Nehru Park, RKB Hostel and ended back at the Dighalipukhuri Park.  While the march was against all forms of discrimination against the LGBTQ community people specifically protested against discriminatory laws like Section 377.

2017 
The fourth edition of the Guwahati Pride was held on 5 February. About 300 people attended the march. The march was supported by students of various universities such as Gauhati University, National Law University, Tata Institute of Social Sciences(TISS) and activists from West Bengal, Karnataka, and Tamil Nadu also showed their support. The vibrancy of the event could be seen in its use of colourful banners, masks and performance of Bollywood and Assamese love songs. There was also a protest against laws like AFSPA and there were demands to repeal it. There was a call to implement the NALSA judgement.

2018 
The fifth edition of the Guwahati Pride took place on 11 February. A number of events were held prior to the main pride event such as fundraisers, concerts, and flash mobs. It witnessed participation of people from all across north-east.

2019 
The sixth edition of the Guwahati Pride took place on 3 February at Dighailpukhuri, Guwahati and was attended by many people. Supporters of the LGBT community showed up, danced and held rainbow flags and balloons to show their support.

See also
LGBT rights in India
Homosexuality in India
LGBT culture in India

References

LGBT rights in India
Pride parades in India
2014 establishments in Assam
Recurring events established in 2014
Guwahati